Tilapia baloni is a species of Cichlid native to the Congo River basin of western Zambia. It is named after Polish-Canadian ichthyologist Eugene K. Balon.

References

Further reading 
 Eschmeyer, William N., ed. 1998. Catalog of Fishes. Special Publication of the Center for Biodiversity Research and Information, núm. 1, vol. 1–3. California Academy of Sciences. San Francisco. 2905. .
 Fenner, Robert M.: The Conscientious Marine Aquarist. Neptune City, New Jersey: T.F.H. Publications, 2001.
 Helfman, G., B. Collette y D. Facey: The diversity of fishes. Blackwell Science, Malden, Massachusetts, 1997.
 Hoese, D.F. 1986. A M.M. Smith y P.C. Heemstra (eds.) Smiths' sea fishes. Springer-Verlag, Berlin.
 Maugé, L.A. 1986. A J. Daget, J.-P. Gosse y D.F.E. Thys van den Audenaerde (eds.) Check-list of the freshwater fishes of Africa (CLOFFA). ISNB, Brussels; MRAC, Tervuren, Belgium; y ORSTOM, Paris. Vol. 2.
 Moyle, P. y J. Cech.: Fishes: An Introduction to Ichthyology, 4a. edición, Upper Saddle River, New Jersey: Prentice-Hall.2000.
 Nelson, J.: Fishes of the World, 3rd. edition. New York: John Wiley and Sons.1994.
 Wheeler, A.: The World Encyclopedia of Fishes, 2nd. edition, London: Macdonald. 1985.

baloni
Taxa named by Ethelwynn Trewavas
Fish described in 1975